The 1975–76 San Antonio Spurs season was the third season in San Antonio and the last in the ABA. The Spurs made it into the 1975 ABA Playoffs, but the Spurs would lose 4–3 to the New York Nets in the ABA Semifinals. Despite never winning a playoff series in the ABA, the Spurs would be admitted to the NBA along with the Indiana Pacers, the New York Nets, and the Denver Nuggets.

ABA Draft

Regular season

Schedule

Season standings

Roster

ABA Playoffs
Semifinals

References

External links 
Spurs on Basketball Reference
RememberTheABA.com 1975–76 regular season and playoff results
RememberTheABA.com San Antonio Spurs page
RememberTheABA.com 1975–76 game by game results

San Antonio
San Antonio Spurs seasons
San Antonio
San Antonio